Phymatodes dimidiatus is a species of beetle in the family Cerambycidae. It was described by William Kirby in 1837.

References

Phymatodes
Beetles described in 1837